"Rebecca Lynn" is a song co-written by Skip Ewing and Don Sampson, originally recorded by Ewing on his 1990 album A Healin' Fire.

It was later recorded by American country music singer Bryan White.  It was released in September 1995 as the fourth and final single from his self-titled debut album. The song reached a peak of Number One on the Billboard country charts in early 1996, giving White his second Number One.

Content
"Rebecca Lynn" is a mid-tempo country ballad in which the narrator recalls a female named Rebecca Lynn, a "quiet girl with green eyes full of fire" with whom he fell in love in second grade. The first verse and chorus follow them through elementary school as they play together. In the second verse, they learn in high school "what it really means to be in love" and eventually get engaged after the prom. By the third verse, the two have married and had a child named Laura Jean together as well.

At Music Fest '96, White sang the song to Rebecca Lynn Rushing, a fan of his who was then 6 years old. The song also won White the TNN/Music City News award for Single of the Year.

Critical reception
Tom Lanham of New Country magazine favorably compared White's delivery on the song to that of Vince Gill, calling the song "lazy small-town reminiscence".

Music video
The music video was directed by Jeffrey C. Phillips and premiered in late 1995.

Chart positions

Year-end charts

References

1995 singles
1990 songs
Skip Ewing songs
Bryan White songs
Songs written by Skip Ewing
Song recordings produced by Kyle Lehning
Song recordings produced by Billy Joe Walker Jr.
Asylum Records singles
Songs written by Don Sampson